The following is a comprehensive discography of Starship, an American rock band which spun off from Jefferson Starship in 1985.

Albums

Studio albums

Compilation albums

Singles

Other appearances

Videos

Music videos

Notes

References

Discographies of American artists
Rock music group discographies